The Durango F-85 was an early personal computer introduced in September 1978 by Durango Systems Corporation, a company started in 1977 by George E. Comstock, John M. Scandalios and Charles L. Waggoner, all formerly of Diablo Systems. The F-85 could run its own multitasking operating system called DX-85M, which included an integral Indexed Sequential (ISAM) file system and per-task file locking, or alternatively CP/M-80. DX-85M utilized a text configuration file named CONFIG.SYS five years before this filename was used for a similar purpose under MS-DOS/PC DOS 2.0 in 1983.

The F-85 used single-sided 5¼-inch 100 tpi diskette drives providing 480 KB utilizing a high-density 4/5 group coded encoding. The machine was using a Western Digital FD1781 floppy-disk controller with 77-track Micropolis drives. In later models this was expanded to a double-sided option for 960 KB (946/947 KB formatted) per diskette.

Durango later dropped the "F-85" model name and adopted a user model system, with 700 being the entry model and 950 being the full-featured model.

Still later, they designed a 80186-/80286-based 16-bit system, the Durango "Poppy"; MS-DOS was selected as the entry operating system.

See also
Group coded recording

Notes

References

Further reading
 https://books.google.com/books?id=XPDvkYPCkWgC&pg=PA86&lpg=PA86
 https://books.google.com/books?id=Alpvxl7sBqIC&pg=RA1-PA63&lpg=RA1-PA63
 https://books.google.com/books?id=qZiwCwAAQBAJ&pg=PA185&lpg=PA185

External links
 

Personal computers